Domingo Tirado Benedí (September 7, 1898, Campillo de Aragón, Zaragoza, Aragón, Spain – January 1, 1971, Mexico City) was a Spanish-born educator.

Collaborated on the Diccionario de Pedagogía Labor (1936) and, like many other artists, scientists and intellectuals, relocated to Mexico during the Spanish Civil War. In Mexico he edited La Ciencia de la Educación with another Spanish exile, Santiago Hernández Ruiz and formed part of the Technical Council of Normal Education. He was of significant influence in pedagogy in Mexico writing, editing and translating books on this topic.

Hernández Ruiz returned to Spain in the 1960s but Tirado remained in Mexico. He died in Mexico City in 1971.

Publications
 La enseñanza de las ciencias de la naturaleza
 El problema de los fines generales de la educación y la enseñanza
 Sociología de la educación
 Métodos de educación y enseñanza
 Problemas de la educación mexicana
 Cooperativas, talleres y granjas escolares
 Problemas de organización escolar

External links
  Profile
  Educators of the 20th century from Spain

1898 births
1971 deaths
People from Comunidad de Calatayud
Mexican male writers
Spanish male writers
Spanish emigrants to Mexico